Grenville County may refer to:
 Grenville County, Ontario, Canada
 County of Grenville, Victoria, Australia